Yermak Point is a coastal point in the west part of Rennick Bay,  west-northwest of Znamenskiy Island, Antarctica. It was named by the Soviet Antarctic Expedition (1958) after the Soviet icebreaker Yermak.

Headlands of Victoria Land
Pennell Coast